Normand Brathwaite (born August 27, 1958)  is a Quebec comedian, movie and television actor, radio and television host and musician. He is known for hosting television variety shows for over 10 years, including Piment Fort as well as the Montreal radio morning show Yé trop de bonne heure on CKOI-FM for 15 years.  He currently hosts CITE-FM's Mix 80 on Saturdays 4-8pm since August 2011.

Background

After studying Theatre at Collège Lionel-Groulx, in Sainte-Thérèse, Quebec, Brathwaite started to participate in theatrical plays in 1977 and played in 1981 the musical comedy show La Cage aux folles.

From 1979 to 1991, he participated in several television shows as an actor including Chez Denise, L'Ingenieux Don Quichotte, Peau de banane and Le 101 Ouest Avenue des Pins as well as minor roles in a few movies such as The Moderns and If Only during the late 1980s.

His first role as a television host was in 1988 when he hosted for nearly six-year Beau et Chaud. Starting in 1993, he was the host of the satirical and humor show Piment Fort which aired on TVA until 2001 and was the show's only host. While being one of the most popular evening shows in Quebec it was criticized for controversial content against various celebrities. After Piment Fort was removed from the TVA schedule, he briefly hosted the TQS show Fun Noir. He is currently the host of Télé-Quebec's Belle et Bum  . He also hosted several awards shows such as the Gemini Awards for over 10 years as well as the Jutra Awards in 2006. He also hosted several festivities and concerts related to Quebec National Day.

From 1990 to 2006, he hosted the CKOI-FM morning show Yé trop de bonne heure but left the station following major conflicts with co-host and comedian Jean-René Dufort.  He returned to the station in 2009 for the Tout un retour show that runs from weekdays 3-6 pm.

Brathwaite was married to Quebec singer Johanne Blouin and has a daughter Élizabeth Blouin-Brathwaite who is also a singer. Brathwaite also has a son, Edouard Brathwaite. He was also a spokesperson for Muscular Dystrophy Canada Foundation  as well as a current advertisement spokesperson for Réno-Dépôt and Kaizen Sushi Bar & Restaurant.

Awards

Brathwaite received several awards including four consecutive Metro Star awards as the best host in a game show as well as Gemini Awards as the best host in a variety show in 1988, 1989 and 1992. The Académie canadienne du cinéma et de la télévision honored him in 2003 for his three Gemini Awards he won when he was the host of Beau et Chaud. During the 2006 Gemini Awards, he received an honorary award for his career.

Filmography

Movie
 Qui a tiré sur nos histoires d'amour (1986)
 If Only (1987)
 The Moderns (1988)

Television

Actor
 Chez Denise (1979–1982)
 Jeune delinquant (1980)
 L'Ingénieux Don Quichotte (1981)
 Peau de banane (1982–1987)
 Le 101, ouest, avenue des Pins (1984–1985)
 CTYVON (1990)
 Denise... aujourd'hui (1991)

Host

 Beau et Chaud (1988–1993)
 Piment Fort (1993–2001, 2016–present)
 Fun Noir (200?)
 Gemini Awards (gala) (1988, 1990–2002)
 Le Match des Etoiles (2005)
 Jutra Awards (gala) (2006)
 Belle et Bum (2003–present)
 Privé de sens (2011-2012)

Other

 Chanteurs masqués (2021)

Radio
 Mix 80 (Saturday version; 2011–present)
 Tout un retour (2009–2011)
 Yé trop de bonne heure (1990–2006)
 Idole instantanée (2005)

External links
 
 Biography from the Muscular Dystrophy Canada Foundation

References

1958 births
Living people
Canadian people of Jamaican descent
Male actors from Montreal
Black Canadian male actors
Canadian male film actors
Canadian game show hosts
Canadian male television actors
Canadian television variety show hosts
Francophone Quebec people
Télé-Québec people
Comedians from Montreal